Moe Moe  (24 October 1994) was a Burmese writer. She won the Myanmar National Literature Award four times.
She is considered one of the most influential Burmese women writers. She wrote 101 short stories and serial novels, 24 full-length novels and 55 articles.

Early life and education 

Moe Moe (Inya) was born in DaikU , Bago Region, Myanmar on 1944 October 24. Her father was Biritsh U Tun and her mother was Daw Mya Shin. She graduated with a B.S. in Math from Yangon University.

Careers 
Under her pen name Inya, she began writing poems while attending Yangon University in 1964.

in 1972, she wrote her first novel, ‘Pyauk-thaw-lann-hmar san-ta-war’, which received the National Literature Award in 1974. 

In 1980, 1982 and 1986, she received short story awards for her short stories and anthologies. From 1989 to until the period before her death, she worked as the editor of Sabel Phyu Magazine.

Published Books

Kywaymalo Nat Way Waymalo Nat Kyway (ကြွေမလိုနဲ့ဝေ ဝေမလိုနဲ့ကြွေ) - 1981
Joe (ဂျိုး)- 1980
Ngapali Zat Lann (ငပလီဇာတ်လမ်း) - 1976
Nyein ko Shet Par (ငြိမ်းကိုရှက်ပါ)- 1981
Nyimalay Ka Achitko Koekwaethatetlar (ညီမလေးက အချစ်ကို ကိုးကွယ်သတဲ့လား) - 1981
Pyautethaw Lan Mhar Santawar (ပျောက်သောလမ်းမှာ စမ်းတဝါး; Bewildering on the Lost Road ) - 1974
 Ma Thudamasari (1982)

The list of novels made into film

Achit Sothaw Ayar (အချစ်ဆိုသောအရာ) 1976

Mhataparr Acharmashi Pyi (မှတစ်ပါး အခြားမရှိပြီ) 1987

 Ma Thudamasari (film), 1994 film adaptation of Ma Thudamasari

Death
She died in Yangon on March 13, 1990. At the time of her death she was survived by her husband, Myo Nyunt (also literary figure), two sons, and one daughter.

References

1944 births
1990 deaths
Burmese writers
People from Bago Region